Expressway S47 (abbreviated as S47) – former planned expressway in Poland on the stretch of national road 47 between Rabka-Zdrój and Zakopane.

History 
The road was included in the Regulation of the Council of Ministers of September 29, 2001 as a new expressway planned on the entire course of the existing national road 47. The project had been heavily criticised by the inhabitants of villages located near the route.

With the next regulation, published in 2003, the expressway has been cancelled and will not be constructed.

See also 
 National road 47
 Zakopianka

References 

Expressways in Poland
Unbuilt buildings and structures